is a passenger railway station in the city of Hashimoto, Wakayama Prefecture, Japan, operated by the private railway company Nankai Electric Railway.

Lines
Miyukitsuji Station is served by the Nankai Kōya Line, and is located 41.9 kilometers from the terminus of the line at Shiomibashi Station and 41.2 kilometers from Namba Station.

Station layout
The station consists of two elevated opposed side platforms with the station building underneath. The platform can accommodate 8 carriages. The station is unattended.

Platforms

Adjacent stations

History
The line was renamed the Osaka Takano Railway on April 30 of the same year, and part of the Nankai Railway network through mergers in 1922. The station was renamed to its present name on April 21, 1923. The Nankai Railway was merged into the Kintetsu group in 1944 by orders of the Japanese government, and reemerged as the Nankai Railway Company in 1947. The tracks were elevated in 1992 and then new station building was complete din 1995.

Passenger statistics
In fiscal 2019, the station was used by an average of 2760 passengers daily (boarding passengers only).

Surrounding area
 Satsukidai (Hashimoto Garden Town Satsukidai)
 Hashimoto City Kimi Elementary School

See also
List of railway stations in Japan

References

External links

 Miyukitsuji Station Official Site

Railway stations in Japan opened in 1915
Railway stations in Wakayama Prefecture
Hashimoto, Wakayama